Acacia praelongata is a shrub of the genus Acacia and the subgenus Plurinerves that is endemic to are area of northern Australia.

Description
Like most species of Acacia it has phyllodes rather than true leaves.

Taxonomy
The species was first formally described by the botanist Ferdinand von Mueller in 1884 as published in The Australasian Chemist and Druggist. It was reclassified as Racosperma praelongatum by Leslie Pedley in 2003 then transferred back to genus Acacia in 2006.

Distribution
It is found in north western parts of the Northern Territory including on Melville Island to the north and down to around Katherine in the south where it is found growing in gravelly lateritic soils with a scattered distribution amongst open woodland and forest communities.

Cultivation
The plant is available commercially and is used in rockeries or in filling in gardens where it is noted as being waterwise, a good screening plant and being bird and butterfly attracting.

See also
List of Acacia species

References

praelongata
Taxa named by Ferdinand von Mueller
Plants described in 1884
Flora of the Northern Territory